The 1974 Mr. Olympia contest was an IFBB professional bodybuilding competition held on October 12, 1974 at the Felt Forum at Madison Square Garden in New York City, New York.  It was the 10th Mr. Olympia competition held.

Results

Over 200lbs

 Serge Nubret (France) was listed as third-place winner. Nubret did not compete in the 1974 contest though.

Under 200lbs

Overall winner

Notable events
Arnold Schwarzenegger won his fifth consecutive Mr. Olympia title.
 This was the first Mr. Olympia to have two weight classes; the two-class scoring system would continue until the 1979 contest.

References

2. Correct results and date of the event : Joe Roark, former IFBB historian,  www.ironhistory.com

External links 
 Mr. Olympia

 1974
1974 in American sports
1974 in bodybuilding